Alexander Fyodorovich Goedicke (in Moscow9 July 1957 in Moscow) was a Soviet and Russian composer and pianist.

Goedicke was a professor at Moscow Conservatory. With no formal training in composition, he studied piano at the Moscow Conservatory with Galli, Pavel Pabst and Vasily Safonov. Goedicke won the Anton Rubinstein Competition in 1900. Despite his lack of traditional guidance, his compositional efforts were rewarded when he won the Rubinstein Prize for Composition at the young age of 23. Goedicke died at the age of 80 on 9 July 1957.

Alexander Goedicke was Nikolai Medtner's first cousin. Alexander's father Fyodor Goedicke, a minor composer and pianist, was Medtner's mother's brother and his first teacher.

Selected works
Opera
 Virineya (Виринея) (1913–1915); libretto by the composer
 At the Crossing (У перевоза) (1933); libretto by the composer
 Jacquerie (Жакерия) (1933–1937); libretto by the composer
 Macbeth (Макбет) (1944); libretto by the composer after William Shakespeare

Orchestral
 Dramatic Overture (Драматическая увертюра), Op. 7 (1897)
 Symphony No. 1 in F minor, Op. 15 (1903)
 Symphony No. 2 in A major, Op. 16 (1905)
 Prelude for string orchestra, organ, trumpet and harp, Op. 24 (published 1928)
 On War: From the Diary of a Fallen Soldier (На войне: из дневника убитого воина), 6 Improvisations, Op. 26 (published 1930)
 Symphony No. 3 in C minor, Op. 30 (1922)
 Зарницы, Symphonic Poem, Op. 39 (1929)
 25 лет Октября (1942)
 1941 год (1942)
 30 лет Октября (1947)
 The Comedian

Concert band
 4 Marches (4 марша для военного оркестра) for military orchestra, Op. 42

Concertante
 Concert Piece (Concertstück) in B minor for piano and orchestra, Op. 11 (1900)
 Concerto in D major for organ and string orchestra, Op. 35 (1927)
 Concerto in F minor for horn and orchestra, Op. 40 (published 1929)
 Concerto in B minor for trumpet and orchestra, Op. 41 (published 1930)
 Concerto for violin and orchestra (1951)

Chamber music
 Sonata No. 1 Spring ("Весенняя") in A major for violin (or viola) and piano, Op. 10 (1899); dedicated to Jan Hřímalý
 Piano Trio in G minor, Op. 14 (published 1903)
 Piano Quintet in C major, Op. 21 (published 1911)
 3 Improvizations (3 импровизации) for cello and piano, Op. 27 (published 1926)
 2 Pieces for clarinet and piano, Op. 28
     Nocturne
     Etude
 String Quartet No. 1 in C minor, Op. 33
 Concert Etude (Концертный этюд) in G minor for trumpet and piano, Op. 49 (1948)
 String Quartet No. 2, Op. 75
 10 Pieces of Medium Difficulty in 1st Position (10 пьес средней трудности в первой позиции) for violin and piano, Op. 80 (published 1948)
 Sonata No. 2 for violin and piano, Op. 83
 Sonata for cello and piano, Op. 88 (published 1951)

Organ
 2 Preludes and Fugues (2 прелюдии и фуги), Op. 34
 7 Pieces, Op. 84

Piano
 4 Morceaux, Op. 1 (published 1899)
     Prélude in C minor
     Petite valse in F minor
     Duetto
     Scherzo in B minor
 Concert Etude (Концертный этюд) in G minor, Op. 2 No. 2
 20 Little Pieces for Beginners (20 маленьких пьес для начинающих), Op. 6
 10 Miniatures in the Etude Form (10 миниатюр в форме этюдов), Op. 8
 3 Morceaux, Op. 9 (published 1900)
     Méditation
     Prélude
     Tarantella, Étude de concert
 6 Pieces for piano 4 hands, Op. 12
 Ballade, Op. 13
 Stanzas (Stances), Op. 17
 Sonata in D major, Op. 18
 2 Preludes, Op. 19 
 Prelude ("Les aveugles" of Maeterlinck) in C major, Op. 20 (published 1910)
 4 Etudes in Octave, Op. 22
 50 Exercises (50 упражнений), Op. 23
 40 Melodic Etudes for Beginners in Order of Gradual Difficulty (40 мелодических этюдов для начинающих), Op. 32
 60 Simple Piano Pieces for Beginners (60 легких фортепианных пьес для начинающих), Op. 36
 No. 20 Sonatina in C major
 3 Preludes, Op. 51
 5 Pieces, Op. 52 (published 1938)
 22 Pieces, Op. 57
 25 Pieces of Medium Difficulty, Op. 59 
 15 Kirghiz Songs of Medium Difficulty (15 киргизских песен средней трудности), Op. 63
 2 Pieces, Op. 64
 3 Pieces, Op. 65
 3 Pieces, Op. 66
 8 Pieces, Op. 77
 4 Concert Etudes, Op. 82
 Prelude and Fugue in C minor, Op. 86
 Prelude and Fugue in C major, Op. 87
 12 Melodic Etudes of Medium Difficulty (12 мелодических этюдов средней трудности), Op. 101 (published 1964)

Cantata
 Слава советским пилотам (1933); words by Alexsei Alexandrovich Surkov
 Родина радости (1937); words by Alexsei Alexandrovich Surkov

Vocal
 3 Songs (Три Романсы) for voice and piano, Op. 5
 Russian Folk Songs (Русские народные ресни) for voice, violin, cello and piano, Books I–III, Op. 29; Book IV, Op. 31; Book V, Op. 37; Book VI, Op. 38

References

External links 
 
 International Goedicke Organ Competition

1877 births
1957 deaths
19th-century classical composers
19th-century male musicians
19th-century musicians from the Russian Empire
20th-century classical composers
20th-century Russian male musicians
20th-century musicians from the Russian Empire
People's Artists of the RSFSR
Stalin Prize winners
Recipients of the Order of Lenin
Recipients of the Order of the Red Banner of Labour
Russian classical pianists
Male classical pianists
Russian male classical composers
Russian Romantic composers
Russian Futurist composers
Russian opera composers
Male opera composers
Anton Rubinstein Competition prize-winners
Moscow Conservatory alumni
Russian people of German descent
Musicians from Moscow
Academic staff of Moscow Conservatory
Soviet composers